Hidden Singer is a South Korean variety-music TV program broadcast on JTBC. The mechanics are a famous singer and several of their impersonators sing one measure of a song behind the blinds for four rounds. In the first three rounds, an audience of 100 people vote on the person who they think is not the real singer, the person with the most votes would be eliminated. In the final round, the audience votes on who they think is the real singer, the person with the most votes would win the episode. The program is hosted by Jun Hyun-moo.

After around three years of hiatus, since the fourth season's end, the program began its fifth season by airing a "comeback special" episode on June 10, 2018; the regular episodes air starting from June 17, 2018.

A sixth season has been confirmed after two years, starting with a "comeback special" episode that aired on July 31, 2020.

After two years of hiatus, the seventh season will air starting from August 19, 2022. This marks the program celebrating its 10th anniversary.

Series overview

Format
In each episode, one singer is the star of the episode, and in each round, he/she sings with impersonators a certain mission song in the hidden stage  while the audience attempts to find the impersonators and the original singer. If the real singer is eliminated, they stay in the rounds until the end (albeit with null votes). In the end, if an impersonator wins the episode, he/she would receive 20 million won. If the real singer won the episode, the second-place impersonator would get 100,000 times the number of votes they got in the final round.

Round 1
The singer and 5 impersonators go in order (from #1-#6, though before, after, or in between individual parts, multiple or all singers can sing at once). At the end of the first half of the song, the 100-member audience votes on who they believe sounds least like the original singer, and the celebrity panel discusses their votes and thoughts on the real singer's position. When the results are revealed, the number of votes are shown for each person in order, and the one with the highest votes is eliminated. If it is an impersonator, they introduce themself. In round 1, only the doors for the real singer and elimination are opened. As in 3 episodes so far, if the original singer is not in the hidden stage because 6 impersonators were chosen instead of 5, there would be 6 impersonators in the next round.

Round 2
The remaining 5 (or 6) sing half of the next song in the hidden stage (with their positions shuffled). After voting and discussion, the next half of the song is sung, but the doors are opened, and the impersonators faces are revealed. The elimination is then announced, and, if an impersonator is eliminated,  he/she introduces themself.

Round 3
The singer and 3 (or 4) surviving impersonators sing the next song in the hidden stage, but the music does not stop. Instead, the audience votes during the interlude, and the impersonators' and singer's positions are revealed during the second half.
During round 3, the surviving impersonators also introduce themselves. Each one has a nickname like (nickname)(singer's name). Nicknames are usually qualities (like "Handsome Man Nam Jin"), places of origin (like "Jinju Kim Kyung-ho"), or occupations (like "Welder Im Chang-jung"). The impersonators can be celebrities, foreigners, and both male and female regardless of the singer's gender.
Around this time, a medley of the singer's songs (that are not mission songs) are sung by members of the panel and the impersonators.
At the end of round 3, the elimination is announced.

Round 4
The round 4 performance works the same as round 3. The singer and 2 (or 3) surviving impersonators sing the final song in the hidden stage, but the music does not stop. Instead, the audience votes during the interlude on who they think the real singer is. After the votes are cast, the impersonators' and singer's positions are revealed during the second half. After the song the 3rd place is announced, and then the winner. The last surviving impersonator wins money depending on what place they ranked and how many votes they got. This impersonator also gets to go to the end-of-season King of Kings championship. Sometimes, if there is a tie for two impersonators as runner-ups, both impersonators will receive prize money and participate in the championship. If the singer was eliminated prior to announcing the winner, the singer will announce the winner of the episode in place of the host.
Sometimes at the end, an encore is sung by the impersonators and the singer.

Season 6
In the latter half of Season 6, due to the Covid-19 pandemic, the voting system changed. Only the panel of celebrities would be present, and live viewers could vote online when possible during the livestream

King of Kings Championship
For the first 4 seasons, the champions would be divided into Groups A, B, and C. Each singer would sing half of a song behind the door, and the 300-member audience would vote O if they thought the singer was good. They would open the door, an the champion would sing the next half of the song. After all singers in a group had sung, the scores would be revealed, and whoever had the most votes would move to the finals. If two champions tied for the most votes, they both would advance 
In the finals, each singer sings like in the qualifiers, except that the finals were broadcast live, with hundreds of thousands of voters. The winner would get money and a special prize (like an expensive car)
In Seasons 3 and 4, between the qualifiers and the finals, viewers could vote for a "wildcard" who would go to the finals as a fourth member.
In Season 5, the format changed, where each singer would perform one by one, and the score out of 300 would be revealed before the next performer. The top 3 out of the twelve would with money and prizes
In Season 6, the format changed again, where instead of voting O, each voter out of 200 would rate the singer from 1 to 10 (2000 possible points) after each performance, the panel's votes (out of 300 points) were revealed after each stage, and the total votes for each person were revealed at the end. In Season 7, the format is the same as the previous season except the panel's votes were out of 250 points instead.

Season 1

Regular episodes

Episode 15 (Highlights)
Best 7 Performances
1. (Lena Park's part) – "I'll Write You A Letter" (편지할게요)
2. (Kim Jong-seo's part) – "Beautiful Restriction" (아름다운 구속)
3. (Lee Soo-young's part) – "Grace" 
4. (Park Sang-min's part) – "A Farewell to Arms" (무기여 잘 있거라)
5. (Kim Jong-kook's part) – "Walking in One Spot" (제자리걸음)
6. (Lee Moon-se's part) – "Flying in the Deep Night" (깊은 밤을 날아서)
7. (Yoon Min-soo's part) – "Comeback Again" (다시 와주라)
Special Voice Imitation Skills
""Pretty Man Kim Jong-seo" Park Sang-woo (Kim Jong-seo's part)
"18-year-old Jang Yun-jeong" Lila (Jang Yun-jeong's part)
"Invitation Singer Kim Gun-mo" Choi Dong-hwan (Kim Gun-mo's part)
"Lee Moon-se's Voice Doppelganger" Ahn Woong-gi (Lee Moon-se's part)
"Celebrity Voice Imitation Terminator" Ahn Yoon-sang (Park Sang-min's part)
"Musician's Voice Imitation King" K.Will (Kim Jong-kook's part)
Best 5 Participants
1. "Little Lena Park" Oh Ha-neul (Lena Park's part)
2. "Jinju Kim Kyung-ho" Kwak Dong-hyun (Kim Kyung-ho's part)
3. "Male Lee Soo-young" Kim Jae-seon (Lee Soo-young's part)
4. "Broadcasting Screenwriter Jang Yun-jeong" Kim Seon-myung (Jang Yun-jeong's part)
5. "Meat Restaurant Lee Moon-se" Kim Jeong-hoon (Lee Moon-se's part)

King of Kings' Challenge

Season 2

Special episodes

Hidden Singer 2 D-14 (aired on September 28, 2013)
Season 1's Best 5 "Want to See Again" 
1. Lena Park's round 1
2. Lee Soo-young's round 2
3. Kim Jong-kook's round 2
4. Lee Moon-se's round 2
5. Yoon Min-soo's round 4
Best 5 Participants
1. "Little Lena Park" Oh Ha-neul
2. "Jinju Kim Kyung-ho" Won Gil
3. "Male Lee Soo-young" Kim Jae-seon
4. "Broadcasting Screenwriter Jang Yun-jeong" Kim Seon-myung
5. "Meat Restaurant Lee Moon-se" Kim Jeong-hoon
Season 1: King of Kings' Challenge's Best Performances
1. Won Gil – "Heartless" (비정)
2. Ahn Woong-gi – "Old Love" (옛 사랑)
3. Kim Sung-wook – "Piled Up with Longing" (그리움만 쌓이네)
4. Choral of 14 participants – "A Goose's Dream" (거위의 꿈)

Hidden Singer 2 D-7 (aired on October 5, 2013)
Cast
MC: Jun Hyun-moo, Park Ji-yoon
Panel: Joo Young-hoon, Kang Yong-suk, Kim Kyung-ho, Park Hae-mi, Solbi, 
Participant: Oh Ha-neul, Won Gil, Kang Nam-soon, Woo Yeon-soo, Lee Hyun-hak, Paul Song, Oh Ye-joong, Kim Young-hyun, Park Hae-young, Kim Byung-soo, Ahn Woong-gi, Kim Sung-wook, Choi Dong-hwan
Ssulzun in Hidden Singer
Season 2's line-up prediction: Kim Bum-soo, Nam Jin, Park Hyo-shin, Byun Jin-sub, BoA, Shin Seung-hun, IU, Yang Hee-eun, Yoon Do-hyun, Lee So-ra, Lee Seung-chul, Lee Seung-hwan, Lee Sun-hee, Lee Juck, Yim Jae-beom, Im Chang-jung, Jo Sung-mo, Cho Yong-pil, Joo Hyun-mi, Wheesung

Regular episodes

King of Kings' Challenge

Semifinals

Final (live broadcast)

Season 3

Special episodes

Hidden Singer Begins 1 (aired on August 2, 2014)
Hidden Singer Begins 2 (aired on August 9, 2014)
Hidden Singer Lee Sun-hee Special (Episode 0; aired on August 16, 2014)

Regular episodes

King of Kings' Challenge

Semifinals

Final (live broadcast)

All three seasons' King of Kings' Challenge

Season 4

Special episodes

Best performances of Hidden Singer 1 picked by JTBC anchors (aired on September 4, 2015)
Best performances of Hidden Singer 2 picked by Please Take Care of My Refrigerator team (aired on September 11, 2015)
Best performances of Hidden Singer 3 picked by Non-Summit members (aired on September 18, 2015)

Doppel-singer Music Festival

Regular episodes

King of Kings' Challenge

Semifinals

Final (live broadcast)

Season 5

Special episodes

Hidden Singer 5 Comeback Special (aired on June 10, 2018)
MC: Jun Hyun-moo, Song Eun-i (special)
Panel: Kim Kyung-ho, Hwanhee (Fly to the Sky), Gummy, Park Sung-kwang
Highlights of the previous seasons:
Doppelganger had the same voice and appearance with the singer: Lee Moon-se's part (S1 Ep.2), Lee Jae-hoon's part (S3 Ep.2)
Beautiful miracle made by the participant (the singer was eliminated before the last participant): Jo Sung-mo's part (S2 Ep.3), Lee Seung-hwan's part (S3 Ep.10), Min Kyung-hoon's part (S4 Ep.3)
Top 10 legends that you "want to see again":
1st – Late Kim Kwang-seok's part (S2 Ep.12)
2nd – Min Kyung-hoon's part (S4 Ep.3)
3rd – Hwanhee's part (S3 Ep.4)
4th – Im Chang-jung's part (S2 Ep.1)
5th – Wheesung's part (S2 Ep.9)
6th – Lee Sun-hee's part (S3 Ep.1)
7th – Gummy's part (S4 Ep.11)
8th – Lee Seung-hwan's part (S3 Ep.10)
9th – Lee Jae-hoon's part (S3 Ep.2)
10th – Yim Jae-beom's part (S4 Ep.9)
11th – Kim Kyung-ho's part (S1 Pilot 2)
Season 5's line-up prediction: Jeon In-kwon, Psy, Kangta (H.O.T.), Bada (S.E.S.), K.Will, Hong Jin-young, Ailee

Regular episodes

King of Kings' Challenge

All Five Seasons' Doppel-singer Music Festival

Season 6

Special episodes

Hidden Singer 6 Comeback Special - Prologue (aired on July 31, 2020)
MC: Jun Hyun-moo, Song Eun-i (special)
Panel: Jang Minho, K.Will, Seunghee (Oh My Girl)
Congratulatory Squad Appearances (also joins as panel):
 Young Tak (previously appeared on the Wheesung episode as a contestant (S2 Ep.9))
  (previously appeared on the Nam Jin episode as a contestant (S2 Ep.8))
  (previously appeared on the Kim Yeon-woo episode as a contestant (S4 Ep.8))
 
Highlights of the previous seasons:
Best 3 Sync Probabilities of Season 5: Kangta's part (Ep.1 round 3), Lyn's part (Ep.5 round 2), Bada's part (Ep.9 round 4), K.Will's part (Ep.4 round 2)
Trot Singers' Quiz (guessing which one of the six trot singers is not an impersonator)
Season 6 line-up hearing quiz
Season 6's line-up prediction: Rain, Hwasa (Mamamoo), Jang Beom-june, Kim Won-jun, Kim Jong-kook, Jang Yoon-jeong, Baek Ji-young, Lee So-ra, 

Hidden Singer 6 Special Live Broadcast Quiz (aired on September 18, 2020; labelled as episode 7)
MC: Jun Hyun-moo
Panel: Song Eun-i, Shindong (Super Junior), Seunghee (Oh My Girl), Baek Ji-young
Season 6's second half line-up: Kim Jong-kook, Jang Yoon-jeong, Kim Wan-sun, Jang Beom-june, Lee So-ra

Regular episodes

King of Kings' Challenge

Season 7

Regular episodes

King of Kings' Challenge

Ratings

Season 1

Season 2

Season 3

Season 4

Season 5

Season 6

Season 7

Notes

References

External links
 (Season 1) 
 (Season 2) 
 (Season 3) 
 (Season 4) 
 (Season 5) 
 (Season 6) 
 (Season 7) 

JTBC original programming
2013 South Korean television series debuts
Korean-language television shows
South Korean variety television shows
South Korean music television shows